Te Uri-o-Hau (sometimes spelt Te Uri O Hau or Te Uriohau) is a Māori iwi (tribe) based around New Zealand's Kaipara Harbour. It is both an independent iwi and a hapū (sub-tribe) of the larger Ngāti Whātua iwi, alongside Ngāti Whātua-o-Ōrākei, Te Roroa and Te Taoū. Its rohe (tribal area) includes Dargaville, Maungaturoto, Mangawhai, Kaiwaka and Wellsford.

According to the 2018 New Zealand census, about 1,314 people affiliate with the iwi. This compares to 732 in 2001, 1,074 in 2006, and 1,260 in 2013.

History

Former iwi leader Russell Kemp died in 2018 at the age of 71.

Hapū and marae

Hapū

Te Uri-o-Hau is further divided into the following hapū (sub-tribes):

Ngāi Tāhuhu
Ngāti Kaiwhare
Ngāti Kauae
Ngāti Kura
Ngāti Mauku
Ngāti Rangi
Ngāti Tāhinga
Te Uri o Hau

Marae and wharenui

The iwi has the following marae (meeting places) and wharenui (meeting houses):

Naumai, Ngā Uri o te Kotahitanga, Ruawai
Ngā Tai Whakarongorua and Ngā Tai Whakarongorua, Tinopai
Ōruawharo and Kote Rangimārie, Wellsford
Ōtamatea and Aotearoa, Whakapirau
Ōtūrei and Rangimārie Te Aroha, Aratapu
Parirau and Te Whare Mārama, Matakohe
Rāwhitiroa and Rāwhitiroa, Tinopai
Rīpia and Te Orikena, Rīpia
Te Kōwhai and Te Kōwhai, Matakohe
Te Pounga and Te Pounga, Kaiwaka
Waihaua Arapaoa and Kirihipi, Tinopai
Waikāretu Pōuto and Waikāretu, Te Kōpuru
Waiōhou, Tinopai
Waiotea, Tinopai

Organisations

Te Uri o Hau Settlement Trust represents the iwi following its Treaty of Waitangi settlement with the New Zealand Government under Te Uri o Hau Claims Settlement Act 2002. It also represents the iwi as an "iwi authority" during the resource consent process under the Resource Management Act 1991. It is a Tūhono organisation and a trust, and its governance board includes two represents from each of the four Ngā Mātua marae: Otamatea, Waikaretu, Oruawharo and Arapaoa.

The iwi has interests in the territory of Northland Regional Council, Auckland Council and Kaipara District Council.

Religion

According to the 2018 New Zealand census, 53.6% of the iwi has a religious belief and 40% have no religious beliefs. By comparison, 38.1% for the Māori population as a whole has a religious belief.

Notable people

 Paraire Karaka Paikea
 Hone Tūwhare

See also
List of Māori iwi

References

External links
Official website

 
Northland Region
Kaipara District
Auckland Region